Vyacheslav Mikhailovich Nevinny (30 November 1934 – 31 May 2009) was a Soviet and Russian actor who was titled a People's Artist of the USSR in 1986. He worked in the Moscow Art Theatre from 1959 until his death in 2009.

Biography 
Nevinny was born on 30 November 1934 in Tula. After graduating in 1954 from high school, he tried to join the school studio of Moscow Arts Theater, but failed the examinations. After failure, he did not leave a dream to become an actor. Instead, he became employed in the Tula Theatre for Young Spectators as a supporting actor.

In 1955, Nevinny again took an examination in the school studio of Moscow Arts Theater; this time, the attempt was successful. After graduation in 1959 (Viktor Stanitsyn's course), he became an actor. He participated in many performances, such as: 
The Government Inspector (as Khlestakov),
Ivanov (as Borkin),
The Seagull (as Shamraev),
Uncle Vanya (as Telegin),
The Cherry Orchard (as Epikhodov),
Woe from Wit (as Famusov), etc.

In 1960, Nevinny made his debut in cinema as a policeman in the movie Probation. After his first role, Nevinny played in several other movies, The Chairman (as Pavel Markushev) and Ruslan and Ludmila (as Farlaf). Vyacheslav Nevinny also played in the famous comedies The Garage (1979) and It Can't Be! (1975).

In 1984, Nevinny played the role of Sobakevich in Dead Souls. In the same year, he took part in the popular children sci-fi TV series Guest from the Future as space pirate Veselchak U (lit. Jolly Man U).

Yevgeni Gerasimov's comedy Do Not Marry, Girls (1985), in which Nevinny played one of the leads, was very popular with the viewers, as well as his roles in Eldar Ryazanov's comedy Beware of the Car (1966) and Promised Heaven (1991). One of Nevinny's last remarkable film roles was the remake of the famous Italian film Cops and Robbers (1997) by director Nikolai Dostal. Many popular Russian animation characters speak in Nevinny's voice. For many years, Nevinny had diabetes, which grew worse and worse. In 2003, he was taken to a hospital and had to spend a whole year there.

In 2005, Nevinny underwent major surgery. Nevinny's left foot was amputated because of gangrene. In 2006, his second foot was amputated, as the illness progressed.

Nevinny died at the age of 74 on 31 May 2009. President Dmitry Medvedev expressed his condolences to relatives and friends of the actor. Nevinny was buried on 3 June 2009 in Moscow's Troyekurovskoye Cemetery.

Selected filmography 
Actor

 Probation (1960) as Sergei Zaitsev, police officer
 Seven Winds (1962) as Yuriy Zubarov
 The Third Half (1963) as Savchuk
 It Happened at the Police Station (1963) as captain Serebrovsky
 The Green Flame (1964) as Vikharyev
 The Chairman (1964) as Pavel Markushev
 Thirty Three (1965) as Vasily Lyubashkin
 Clean Ponds (1965) as sailor
 Beware of the Car (1966) as car mechanic
 Virineya (1969) as Pavel Sluzov
 Passing Through Moscow (1970) as Valentin
 Russian Field (1972) as Pavel Fomich Fedchenkov
 Ruslan and Ludmila (1972) as Farlaf
 The Last Day (1973) as Stepan Danilovich Stepeshko
 It Can't Be! (1975) as Gorbushkin's brother-in-law, beer seller
 Au-u! (1976) as Writer 
 Incognito from St. Petersburg (1978) as Zemlyanika
 Borrowing Matchsticks (1980) as Jussi Vatanen
 The Garage (1980) as Karpukhin
 The Old New Year (1981) as Pyotr Sebeykin, toy factory worker
 Crazy Day of Engineer Barkasov (1983, TV Movie) as Kobylin
 Guest from the Future (1984, TV miniseries) as Veselchak U, space pirate
 Lev Tolstoy (1984) as Mummer
 Dead Souls (1984, TV miniseries) as Sobakevich
 I Still Love, I Still Hope (1985) as Boris Zakharov
 Do Not Marry, Girls (1985) as Ivan Savelievich Malkov, chairman of a collective farm
 Lilac Ball ( 1987) as Gromozeka, alien archaeologist
 Don't Leave... (1989, TV Movie) as King Theodore
 Shapka (1990) as Vasiliy Tryoshkin
 Promised Heaven ( 1991) as Stepan, bum
 Cops and Robbers (Полицейские и воры, 1997) as Slava

Voice actor
 Hedgehog in the Fog (Ёжик в тумане, 1975, Short) as Bear-Cub
 Alice in Wonderland (Алиса в Стране чудес, 1981) as White Rabbit
 The Adventures of Lolo the Penguin (Приключения пингвинёнка Лоло, 1986, Short) as Pigo, grandfather
 The Kitten from Lizyukov street (Котёнок с улицы Лизюкова, 1988, Short) as Vasily the Cat

Awards and honors 
 Honored Artist of the RSFSR (1967)
 People's Artist of the RSFSR (1977)
 People's Artist of the USSR (1986)
 Order "For Merit to the Fatherland", 4th class (23 October 1998), 3rd class (24 June 2005)
 Order of Friendship of Peoples (28 October 1994)

References

External links 
 
 Вячеслав Невинный 
 Biography of Vyacheslav Nevinny 

1934 births
2009 deaths
20th-century Russian male actors
21st-century Russian male actors
Actors from Tula, Russia
Moscow Art Theatre School alumni
Honored Artists of the RSFSR
People's Artists of the RSFSR
People's Artists of the USSR
Recipients of the Order "For Merit to the Fatherland", 3rd class
Recipients of the Order "For Merit to the Fatherland", 4th class
Recipients of the Order of Friendship of Peoples
Amputee actors
Russian amputees
Russian male film actors
Russian male stage actors
Russian male television actors
Russian male voice actors
Soviet male film actors
Soviet male stage actors
Soviet male television actors
Soviet male voice actors
Deaths from diabetes
Burials in Troyekurovskoye Cemetery